The Aqua Appia was the first Roman aqueduct, constructed in 312 BC by the co-censors Gaius Plautius Venox and Appius Claudius Caecus, the same Roman censor who also built the important Via Appia.

The Appia fed the city of Rome with an estimated  of water per day.

Route
Its source was said by Frontinus to be about 780 paces away from via Praenestina. Nearly all of its length before entering the city was underground, which was necessary because of the relative heights of its source and destination, and which also afforded it protection from attackers during the Samnite Wars that were underway during its construction.

After entering the hilly area of Rome, the aqueduct alternated between tunnels through the Caelian and Aventine Hills and an elevated section. A detailed modern model of ancient Rome shows the aqueduct running along the top of the Servian Wall above the Porta Capena. It dropped only  over its entire length, making it a remarkable engineering achievement for its day.

The Appia ended at the Clivus Publicus at a place called Salinae below the Aventine Hill. The water was distributed to twenty reservoirs through piping. The aqueduct served the private Baths of Decius and Baths of Licinius Sura on the Aventine. The level of the channel was too low to be able to provide water to the hills.

In 2017, a section of the aqueduct was excavated beneath Piazza Celimontana and has been removed for reconstruction elsewhere.

Historical context
As Frontinus explains: "for four hundred and forty-one years from the foundation of the City, the Romans were satisfied with the use of such waters as they drew from the Tiber, from wells, or from springs...But there now run into the City: the Appian aqueduct, Old Anio, Marcia, Tepula, Julia, Virgo, Alsietina, which is also called Augusta, Claudia, New Anio". Rome's first aqueduct was in response to the growing city and population which may have suffered a prolonged drought and major sanitary issues which affected their existing water supplies.

The Aqua Appia was the first test of Roman engineering of its type and is quite unsophisticated in comparison to Rome's ten other aqueducts. Raffaelo Fabretti, one of the first to excavate the Appia, characterises it as "The first fruits of Rome's Foresight and greatness". Nevertheless, the Appia was kept in use into the era of Augustus Caesar through regular maintenance, renovations and even an expansion. Little of the original material remains today and much of information on the aqueduct comes from Frontinus who was appointed as water commissioner and recorded the technical, and some historical, details of the Appia about four hundred years after its completion.

Although there were no formal Roman predecessors for the Aqua Appia, there were plenty of examples that existed in the Greek and Etruscan world. Greek influence came from their use of terracota pipes that were laid along the bottom of a channel or a large tunnel.  This technique relates to the Roman technique in that it uses a water channel within a larger tunnel.  The difference between the two is the fact that the Romans began to favour masonry conduits rather than the terracotta pipes which were generally used by the Greeks throughout the history of their aqueducts. A. Trevor Hodge, in his book "Roman Aqueducts and Water Supply", mentions the possibility that the Romans could indirectly have been influenced by the Iranian qanat which is a tunnel driven into a hillside to tap an aquiferous stratum deep inside it. It is believed that the Etruscan water channel system, the cuniculi is a form of the qanat and Hodge asserts that since the Romans had contact with the Etruscans and openly adopted other aspects of their culture they could have been implementing techniques and skills that were originally of Eastern descent. Etruscan water channels are also generally believed to have a great amount of influence on the Roman Aqua Appia.  Their expertise in underground tunnelling served the function of draining water rather than supplying water.  Nevertheless, undoubtedly the Romans gained much practical knowledge in underground water channelling from the Etruscans.

The beginning of the Aqua Appia 
Gaius Plautius Venox chose the source of the aqueduct thus giving him the nickname Venox (Hunter). However, Appius Claudius had the aqueduct named after him as, according to Frontinus, at the time that the aqueduct was being built the eighteen month terms of Plautius and Appius as censors was coming to an end and under the assumption that Appius was going to resign in appropriate fashion, Plautius went ahead and resigned in a timely manner. However, Appius kept his position by "various subterfuges" in order to extend his term to finish the Via Appia and the Aqua Appia.

The water source that Plautius is credited for is "on the Lucullen estate, between the seventh and eighth milestones, on the Via Praenestina, on a crossroad, 780 paces to the left." Frontinus' text about the source of the Appia has been interpreted as "The source of the original aqueduct lay within the bounds of the vast estate of Lucullus between seven and eight miles from the city, 780 paces 1,153.62 m.) along a crossroad to the left of the Via Praenestina". Although Deman does acknowledge Frontinus' records which indicate that the source is to the left of the Via Praenestina, he also brings up that rather than being left of the Via Praenestina, it is more probable that "it was left of the Via Collatina". Nevertheless, the exact location of the source is unknown but the general location can be pinpointed. It is probable that the Appia had as a source one group of springs with a single collecting basin or reservoir.  The source is thought to have come from the bottom of the Alban Hills in which a stretch of marshland held the springs that fed the Appia.

Construction 

From the reservoir of the source of the Appia, the water was directed into an underground conduit which ran for  into the city. The conduit was carved out of the bedrock and the walls of the channel were lined with carved tufa stone. Furthermore, the stones were poorly cut and poorly fitted which speaks to the structural integrity of the conduit. The roof was ridged with broad shelves on either side. The earliest archaeological evidence was excavated by Raffaello Fabretti and Rodolfo Lanciani whose records show "It consisted of a considerable stretch of channel cut into the tufa of the hill, and lined, possibly at a later time, with walls of rough cut stone". Furthermore, "the channel that was cut into the rock was five and a half feet square with a vaulted roof with a rise of six inches. The walls with which the channel was lined consisted of three courses of cappellaccio (tufa) blocks, 50 to 55 cm high, laid without mortar". The characteristics are the same as those described by Fabretti in his excavations except for the roof. The roof was ridged by the joining of two slabs of cappellaccio to form a gable. This is a similar construction found in the Anio Vetus aqueduct which could be evidence of renovations made in 144 BC.

As with most aqueducts, the conduit was big enough to allow maintenance crews to walk inside to clean out any debris or make any repairs. Also, it is most likely that there were shafts with footholes within the countryside giving access. Regular cleaning up of debris was necessary since, as Frontinus' records indicate, there was no settling tank in the route of the Appia, "Neither Virgo, nor Appia, nor Alsietina has a receiving reservoir or catch-basin".

For the most part, the channel was  underground throughout its course which is relatively shallow in comparison to the other aqueducts perhaps because the Romans were adapting what they knew about their practice in sewers.

Renovations and expansion 

Over the years more aqueducts were built with increasing sophistication and the Aqua Appia was neglected for some time. Nevertheless, the Appia was still kept in use with a few renovations were made and it was expanded by Augustus to allow it to supply more water. In 144 BC the Senate ordered Quintus Marcius Rex to repair the leaks that were forming in the channel and to reclaim the water that was being illegally redirected by citizens who had tapped into the aqueduct. Agrippa made minor repairs again in 33 BC. This phase of renovation is thought to be part of the promise made by Augustus to renovate all of the older aqueducts and add to the Appia by building a new branch called the ramus Augustae whose source was near the source of the Appia "at the sixth milestone, on the Via Praenestina, on a crossroad, 980 paces to the left, near the Via Collatina". The ramus Augustae ran an independent course of 6,380 paces to the spes setus where it joined the Appia. It is this point that Frontinus refers to as Gemelli (the Twins).

Decline

By the end of the 1st c. BC, part of it seems to have been used as a sewer as a recently found section in the Metro C line below Piazza Celimontana contained household waste, particularly food remains.

See also 
Ancient Roman technology
Parco degli Acquedotti
List of aqueducts in the city of Rome
List of aqueducts in the Roman Empire
List of Roman aqueducts by date

References

Other References
Coarelli, Filippo. Rome and environs: an archaeological guide. Berkeley: University of California Press, 2007.
Van Deman, Esther Boise. The building of the Roman aqueducts. Washington: Carnegie institution of Washington, 1934.
Frontinus, Sextus Julius. The Stratagems and The Aqueducts of Rome. 1925. Reprint. London: William Heinemann LTD, 1961.
. Roman aqueducts & water supply. London: Duckworth, 1992.
"Website on Roman aqueducts." Website on Roman aqueducts. N.p., n.d. Web. 13 June 2014.
. The aqueducts of Rome The Water Supply of Ancient Rome. Amsterdam: J.C. Gieben, 2001.
N.p., n.d. Web. 13 June 2014.
Website on Roman aqueducts." Website on Roman aqueducts. N.p., n.d. Web. 13 June 2014. 
Winslow, E. M.. A libation to the gods; the story of the Roman aqueducts. London: Hodder and Stoughton, 1963.

External links 
 
Aqua Appia entry on the Lacus Curtius website
Information on Roman aqueducts
From a list of 25 aqueducts described in detail

Buildings and structures completed in the 4th century BC
Appia
312 BC
4th century BC in Italy
310s BC establishments